The Nokia 8.3 5G is a Nokia-branded smartphone released by HMD Global Oy, running Android One.  It is HMD's first 5G phone, and was announced on 19 March 2020 alongside the Nokia 5.3, Nokia 1.3, and Nokia 5310 (2020).  The Nokia 8.3 5G is claimed by HMD executive Juho Sarvikas to be the first smartphone which is compatible with every 5G network operational .  It was released in September 2020.

Design and specifications
The Nokia 8.3 5G is powered by the Qualcomm Snapdragon 765G system-on-chip.  Depending on model, it has either six or eight gigabytes (GB) of random-access memory (RAM), and 64 or 128 GB of internal storage, which can be expanded with a microSD card up to 512 GB.  In the dual-SIM model, there is space for two nano-SIMs and a microSD card.

It has a  FHD+ 'PureDisplay' with a 24 megapixel (MP) punch hole camera and a chin at the bottom with the Nokia logo.

The Nokia 8.3 5G has a quad-camera system with ZEISS optics, consisting of a 64 MP rear camera, a 12 MP ultra-wide camera, a 2 MP macro camera, and a 2 MP depth sensor.  The 8.3 5G is the second Nokia Android smartphone to be advertised with a 'PureView' camera, after the Nokia 9 PureView.

References

8.3 5G
Mobile phones introduced in 2020
Mobile phones with multiple rear cameras
Mobile phones with 4K video recording
PureView
Discontinued smartphones